Hotel King is a 2014 South Korean television series starring Lee Dong-wook, Lee Da-hae, Lim Seul-ong, Wang Ji-hye, Lee Deok-hwa and Kim Hae-sook. It aired on MBC from April 5 to July 27, 2014 on Saturdays and Sundays at 21:45 for 32 episodes.

Lee Dong-wook and Lee Da-hae previously starred together in My Girl (2005).

Synopsis

A love story between a heiress who tries to save her father's legacy, the one and only seven-star hotel in the nation, and a hotel manager who becomes his mentor's enemy in order to protect her.

Cast

Main characters
Lee Dong-wook as Cha Jae-wan/Jayden/Baek Hyun-woo
The cool-headed, polished general manager of Hotel Ciel. Jae-wan hides a painful past; his unknown father had abandoned him and his mother to a life of poverty. Yet Jae-wan rises from his miserable beginnings to become the youngest ever general manager with such steely competence that he earns himself the nickname of "hotel monster." A succession battle ignites when Jae-wan is told that his biological father was Chairman Ah, the recently deceased owner of Hotel Ciel.

Lee Da-hae as Ah Mo-ne/Bok-Soon
Mo-ne is an heiress, the only daughter of the chairman of Hotel Ciel, the only seven-star hotel in Korea. Upon her father's death, she becomes the hotel's primary successor. But Mo-ne is utterly unqualified to take over the business, having lived a pampered, sheltered life, coupled with her flighty, unpredictable personality which makes her cheerfully barge into the executive ranks with nary a care for propriety or tact. But once the hotel faces a crisis, she must rise to the occasion and struggle to protect it.

Wang Ji-hye as Song Chae-kyung
The owner of Hotel Ciel's Hamill restaurant, and Jae-wan's ex-girlfriend. She is the widow of the former chairman of the wealthy GR Group. Regretting her choice of marrying another man for money, Chae-kyung tries to win back Jae-wan's love.

Lim Seul-ong as Sunwoo Hyun
An optimistic, loud and hard working hotel concierge, Hyun is often at odds with Jae-wan. Hyun is assigned to help out Mo-ne when she first comes to Hotel Ciel, teaching her the ropes and bailing her out of scrapes. As he grows to care for her, he becomes even more determined to help Mo-ne save the hotel. It is later revealed that he is the son of the owner of a farm.

Lee Deok-hwa as Lee Joong-goo
Vice chairman of Hotel Ciel. He tells Jae-wan that he is the biological son of Chairman Ah, owner of Hotel Ciel, and takes the young man under his wing, promising to turn Jae-wan into the best in the business and make him king. It is later revealed that he is, in fact, Jae-wan's biological father.

Kim Hae-sook as Baek Mi-nyeo
Training manager of Hotel Ciel. It is later revealed that her real name is Baek Mi-yeon, and that she was Ah Sung-won's former lover and Cha Jae-wan's biological mother. She schemes to destroy Hotel Ciel in order to avenge the death of her real son (Hyun-woo/Jae-wan).

Jin Tae-hyun as Roman Lee/Lee Ju-han
A prospective investor of Hotel Ciel, who is later revealed to be Baek Mi-nyeo's son and a blood brother to Cha Jae-wan. He shares the same past as Cha Jae-wan and is a brother figure to him.

Supporting characters
Gong Hyun-joo as Cha Soo-an
The highly educated hotel VIP supervisor, who looks up highly upon Cha Jae-wan. One of the four specialists brought in by General Manager Cha Jae-wan from his former workplace in Las Vegas to assist him in the hotel. Later, she helps Jae-wan and Mo-ne to retrieve the hotel again.

Alex Chu as Yoo Joon-sung
The Food & Kitchen Team Leader, who is friendly and flirtatious. One of the four specialists brought in by General Manager Cha Jae-wan from his former workplace in Las Vegas to assist him in the hotel. It is revealed later that Joon-sung has been secretly helping to Manager Baek Mi-nyeo, much to the dismay of his friends.

Kim Sun-hyuk as Hong Joon
The Guest Room Team Leader, who has a bad temper. One of the four specialists brought in by General Manager Cha Jae-wan from his former workplace in Las Vegas to assist him in the hotel.

Go Yoon as Park Do-jin
The Concierge Team Leader, who often uses English to taunt the locally educated employees. One of the four specialists brought in by General Manager Cha Jae-wan from his former workplace in Las Vegas to assist him in the hotel.

Park Chul-min as Jang Ho-il
The Guest Room Manager who is narcissistic and often spreads rumours. He was under the assumption that So Moon-jung had a crush on him.

Jung Suk-yong as Go San
Fondly known as "Captain Go", he is a concierge at Hotel Ciel. In a relationship with So Moon-jung.

Ji Il-joo as Jin Jung-hyun
A front-desk concierge at Hotel Ciel along with Yoon Da-jung, with whom he develops a romantic interest in.

Kim Ye-won as Yoon Da-jung
A front-desk concierge at Hotel Ciel who dreams of marrying a rich suitor.

Yoo Se-hyung as Eun Joon-jae
Kim Sung-young as So Moon-jung
A maid at Hotel Ciel who constantly creates rumours and gossips about people in the hotel. In a relationship with Go San.

Kim Kyu-sun as Ha So-yeon
A maid at Hotel Ciel.

Goo Bon-im as Madam Kim
A maid at Hotel Ciel.

Cha Hak-yeon as Noah
A bright and lively hotel employee.

Lee Do-yeon as Lee Ip-sae
Lee Sang-mi as Yoon Ji-won
Lee Joong-goo's wife and Lee Da-bae's mother. She is a well-known philanthropist and poetry writer.

Seo Yi-an as Lee Da-bae
Lee Joong-goo's daughter and Cha Jae-wan's half sister. She is a jovial girl, who enjoys helping society.

Choi Sang-hoon as Ah Sung-won
The deceased Chairman of Hotel Ciel and Ah Mo-ne's father.

Yoo Gun as John Howard
Cho Yoon-woo as Yoo Joo-min (cameo, ep 17)
Lee Joo-yeon as Chae-won (cameo, ep 31-32)
A proud and bossy top celebrity.

Kim Ha-rin as Baek Mi-yeon

Production
The first script reading took place in February 2014.

Original soundtrack

The official soundtrack album for Hotel King was released on July 25, 2014. It was the debut foray of the famous Korean online auction and shopping mall Inter Park to the music industry business.

Ratings
In the tables below, the blue numbers represent the lowest ratings and the red numbers represent the highest ratings.

Awards and nominations

International broadcast
The series became very popular in China and has recorded the second highest TV ratings among Korean dramas on Baidu during its run. It has also been the number one Korean drama on iQiyi, a Chinese video website, reaching more than 200 million views, and the 5th most popular drama in China during its run.

It aired in Japan on cable channel KNTV from May 5 to September 15, 2014.

It aired in Thailand on Workpoint TV beginning July 23, 2014.

It aired in Vietnam on VTV and on HTV2 cable channel with a local title of Vua khách sạn from April 2, 2015.

It aired in Taiwan on GTV starting May 6, 2015.

It aired on Oh!K, a subscription pay cable and satellite television channel currently available in Singapore, Indonesia, Malaysia, and Brunei.

It is airing on NTDTV KXLA 44.7 starting on March 25, 2016, 11:00 pm (localtime)

References

External links
Hotel King official MBC website 
Hotel King at MBC Global Media

2014 South Korean television series debuts
2014 South Korean television series endings
MBC TV television dramas
Korean-language television shows
Television series set in hotels
South Korean melodrama television series
South Korean romance television series